Fahlén is a Swedish surname. Notable people with the surname include: 

Margareta Fahlén (1918–1978), Swedish actress
Sven Fahlén (born 1959), Swedish biathlete

Swedish-language surnames